A Scottie or Scottish Terrier is a breed of dog that originated from Scotland.

Scottie may also refer to:

People

Scottie Barnes (born 2001), American basketball player
Scottie Beam (born 1990), American digital producer and model
Scottie Cuevas (born 1965), American politician
Scottie Graham (born 1969), American football player
Scottie Hazelton (born 1973), American football coach
Scottie James (born 1996), American basketball player in the Israeli Basketball Premier League
Scottie Lindsey (born 1996), American basketball player
Scottie Mayfield (born 1950/1951), American business executive
Scottie McClue, radio personality
Scottie Montgomery (born 1978) American football coach and former player
Ann Moray (1909-1981), novelist and singer
Scottie Nell Hughes (born 1980), American journalist, news anchor and political commentator
Scottie Pippen (born 1965), American basketball player
Scottie Reynolds (born 1987), American basketball player
Scottie Scheffler (born 1996), American golfer
Scottie Slayback (1901–1979), American baseball player
Scottie Thompson (born 1981), American actress
Scottie Thompson (basketball) (born 1993), Filipino basketball player
Scottie Upshall (born 1983), Canadian ice hockey player
Scottie Vines (born 1979), American football player
Scottie Wilbekin (born 1993), Turkish-American basketball player in the Israeli Basketball Premier League
Scottie Wilson (1888–1972), Scottish artist

Fictional characters
Scottie McTerrier, Donald Duck universe character, former caretaker of McDuck Castle

Other uses
Scottie (album), album by organist Shirley Scott
Scottie (horse) (1957–1981), stock horse

See also
Scotties, a facial tissue brand
Scotty (disambiguation)
Scoti, an Irish tribe
Scottee, British artist and writer